Moses Ross House is a historic home located in Londonderry Township, Chester County, Pennsylvania. It was built about 1850, and is a two-story, five bay, "L"-shaped brick dwelling with a full basement and attic.  It has a gable roof and features a large two-story, pedimented front portico in the Greek Revival style.

It was added to the National Register of Historic Places in 1985.

References

Houses on the National Register of Historic Places in Pennsylvania
Greek Revival houses in Pennsylvania
Houses completed in 1850
Houses in Chester County, Pennsylvania
National Register of Historic Places in Chester County, Pennsylvania